Hank Steinberg (born November 19, 1969) is an American television and film writer, producer and director.

Personal life
Hank Steinberg was born in Manhasset, New York, and raised in nearby Great Neck, both on Long Island. The son of Judy Hiller and attorney Howard E. Steinberg, former Chairman of the New York State Thruway Authority and the Long Island Power Authority, he attended Great Neck North High School, graduating in 1987. He went on to the University of Pennsylvania, where he and was a sportswriter for the student-run newspaper The Daily Pennsylvanian and graduated in 1991 with a degree in English literature. Hank Steinberg is Jewish.

Career
In 1997, Steinberg successfully sold the cable network HBO on 61*, a biographical drama about the legendary home-run race between Roger Maris and Mickey Mantle of the 1961 Yankees. A lifetime Yankees fan, Steinberg got the idea for the film while strolling through Monument Park at the old Yankee Stadium. The following year, Billy Crystal came aboard as a producer on the project and subsequently directed the film, starring Thomas Jane and Barry Pepper. 61* garnered 12 Emmy nominations, including Best Motion Picture for Television and Best Writing.  Steinberg was also nominated for a WGA Award for the film.

Steinberg next wrote the Robert F. Kennedy biographical drama RFK for the cable network FX. Premiering August 25, 2002, it detailed Kennedy's life following the assassination of his brother, President John F. Kennedy, in 1963.

Steinberg then created the CBS show Without a Trace,  which aired from September 26, 2002, to May 19, 2009.  Without a Trace follows the cases of a Missing Persons Unit of the FBI in New York City.  During his tenure as executive producer and show-runner, the show won several Emmy awards and a Golden Globe for lead actor Anthony LaPaglia, as well as earning a SAG and Humanitas nomination. Steinberg was executive producer and show-runner of Without a Trace for the first three-and-a-half seasons.

Afterward, Steinberg created and was executive producer of the ABC series The Nine, which he wrote with his sister, KJ Steinberg. It ran seven episodes.

In 2010, HarperCollins purchased the rights to Steinberg's forthcoming novel, Out of Range, making a two-book deal for a potential franchise for the publisher. The book rights were subsequently sold to Paramount Pictures, where Steinberg adapted the book into a screenplay.

In May 2016, Hulu ordered a prehistoric-drama pilot, Dawn, from Steinberg and Ken Nolan. Dawn Follows a tribe of Neanderthals as they struggle to survive and hold on to their way of life after coming into contact with a family of Homo sapiens.

Steinberg co-created and was executive producer of TNT's The Last Ship, in 2014, which had its series finale on November 11, 2018.  The Last Ship, starring Eric Dane, Adam Baldwin, Charles Parnell, Travis Van Winkle, Marissa Neitling, Jocko Sims, Kevin Michael Martin, and Christina Elmore, follows a naval destroyer crew, after a pandemic kills most of Earth's population.

Steinberg went on to create and serve as an executive producer of the ABC American legal drama For Life, which premiered February 11, 2020. The series is a fictional legal and family drama inspired by the life of convict turned attorney Isaac Wright, Jr. The success of the show led his Channel Road Productions company to an overall deal with Sony Pictures Television.

References

External links

Living people
American entertainment industry businesspeople

American television writers
American male television writers
University of Pennsylvania alumni
Showrunners

The Daily Pennsylvanian people
Screenwriters from New York (state)
1969 births